Mirzalu (also Romanized as Mīrzālū; also known as Mirza-Khani and Mīrzā Khānlū) is a village in Darram Rural District, in the Central District of Tarom County, Zanjan Province, Iran. At the 2006 census, its population was 178, in 36 families.

References 

Populated places in Tarom County